The Kulpenburg TV tower is a  telecommunication tower on Kulpenberg mountain in Thuringia, Germany. The observation deck and the restaurant are closed to visitors.

See also
 List of towers

External links
 
http://www.skyscraperpage.com/diagrams/?b41978

Communication towers in Germany
Buildings and structures in Thuringia
Observation towers
Restaurant towers
1964 establishments in East Germany
Towers completed in 1964